English singer Joss Stone has released eight studio albums, one compilation album, three extended plays, 45 singles (including 16 as a featured artist), five promotional singles, one video album and 21 music videos. As of May 2015, Stone had sold more than 14 million albums worldwide.

Stone's debut studio album, The Soul Sessions, was released in September 2003, consisting mostly of cover versions of soul songs from the 1960s and 1970s. The album peaked at number four on the UK Albums Chart and was later certified triple platinum by the British Phonographic Industry (BPI). It produced the singles "Fell in Love with a Boy" and "Super Duper Love", both of which peaked at number 18 on the UK Singles Chart. The Soul Sessions has sold five million copies worldwide.

In September 2004, Stone released her second studio album and her first of original material, Mind Body & Soul. It debuted at number one on the UK Albums Chart, making Stone the youngest female solo artist to top the chart. The album spawned four singles, including "You Had Me", which reached number nine on the UK Singles Chart and became Stone's highest-peaking single on the chart to date. Like its predecessor, Mind Body & Soul was certified triple platinum by the BPI.

Stone's third studio album, Introducing Joss Stone, was released in March 2007. It failed to match the commercial success of Stone's previous albums in her native United Kingdom, reaching number 12 on the UK Albums Chart and being certified silver by the BPI. Nevertheless, the album debuted at number two on the Billboard 200 in the United States, becoming the highest-charting debut by a British female solo artist on the chart in the Nielsen SoundScan era at the time.

Following a highly publicised battle with EMI, Stone released her fourth studio album, Colour Me Free!, in October 2009. It reached number 75 on the UK Albums Chart, her lowest-peaking album to date. After parting ways with EMI in 2010, Stone launched her own record label, Stone'd Records, and released her fifth studio album, LP1, in July 2011, in partnership with independent label Surfdog Records. Stone also joined Mick Jagger, Dave Stewart, A. R. Rahman and Damian Marley to form the supergroup SuperHeavy, who released their eponymous debut album in September 2011. Later that month, EMI released her first compilation album, The Best of Joss Stone 2003–2009. In July 2012, Stone released her sixth studio album, The Soul Sessions Vol. 2, a follow-up to The Soul Sessions that also consists of cover versions of classic soul songs. The album peaked at number six on the UK Albums Chart, earning Stone her first top-10 album since Mind Body & Soul.

Albums

Studio albums

Compilation albums

Extended plays

Singles

As lead artist

As featured artist

Promotional singles

Other charted songs

Guest appearances

Videography

Video albums

Music videos

Notes

References

External links
 
 
 
 

Discographies of British artists
Rhythm and blues discographies
Soul music discographies